Vardan Khachatryan (born 29 October 1968) is an Armenian former footballer who played as a defender. He was a member of the Armenia national football team, and played 30 matches and scored 1 goal since his debut on 14 October 1992, in a friendly match against Moldova.

External links

Profile at Armenian Football

1968 births
Living people
Footballers from Yerevan
Soviet Armenians
Soviet footballers
Armenian footballers
Armenia international footballers
Armenian expatriate footballers
FC Ararat Yerevan players
FC Torpedo Moscow players
FC Pyunik players
FC Rubin Kazan players
FK Köpetdag Aşgabat players
Expatriate footballers in Ukraine
Armenian expatriate sportspeople in Ukraine
Armenian expatriate sportspeople in Turkmenistan
Expatriate footballers in Russia
Expatriate footballers in Turkmenistan
Armenian Premier League players
Ukrainian Premier League players
Russian Premier League players
Association football defenders